Ucross is an unincorporated community along the Piney Creek on the southern edge of Sheridan County, Wyoming, United States.

Ucross has a population of 25. It is part of the so-called UCLA of Wyoming — Ucross, Clearmont, Leiter and Arvada.

The community received its name from the Pratt and Ferris Cattle Company, whose logo had a U with a cross beneath it. In 1981, the Ucross Foundation opened. A 20,000-acre artists retreat, the Foundation has a residency program that has hosted 1,300 artists, writers, and musicians.

Notable person
Walt Longmire mystery novels author Craig Johnson lives in a log cabin in Ucross.

References

External links

Unincorporated communities in Wyoming
Unincorporated communities in Sheridan County, Wyoming